Jason Lowndes (14 December 1994 – 22 December 2017) was an Australian cyclist, who rode professionally for the ,  and  teams.

He died after being hit from behind by a car while cycling near Bendigo, Victoria.

Major results

2015
 5th Overall Grand Prix Cycliste de Saguenay
1st  Young rider classification
 7th White Spot / Delta Road Race
2016
 6th Road race, UCI Under-23 Road World Championships
 10th Road race, National Under-23 Road Championships

References

External links

1994 births
2017 deaths
Australian male cyclists
People from Kalgoorlie
Cycling road incident deaths
Road incident deaths in Victoria (Australia)